Gustavus Henry March-Phillipps,  (1908  – 12 September 1942; sometimes spelled "March-Phillips") was the founder of the British Army's No. 62 Commando, the Small Scale Raiding Force (SSRF), a precursor of the Special Air Service (SAS).

In the Daily Telegraph, Max Hastings noted: "In January 1942 he launched Operation Postmaster, a picaresque 'cutting-out expedition', which seized two Italian merchantmen from the neutral Spanish colonial port of Santa Isabel in West Africa, and towed them triumphantly to Lagos." After the raid March-Phillipps was awarded the Distinguished Service Order.

Military career
March-Phillipps was killed in Operation Aquatint in September 1942. This secret operation took place on the German-occupied French coastlines. In an attempt to hurt the enemy, increase allied morale, and change the tide of the Second World War, March-Phillips led a special forces raider team (SSRF) of 11 onto a beach via Goatley canoes. None of them would return.

After they had landed on an incorrect area of the beach along the French coastline, a heavily-armed German patrol stumbled upon them and engaged the Raider force with unrelenting fire power. Abort was yelled, and the men hurried back to their canoes. In the next frantic moments, four men were severely injured and taken prisoner, four were on the run – to be eventually taken prisoner after a daring escape – and three were killed. The dead included the founder and inspirational leader and visionary of the Small Scale Raiding Force (SSRF), March-Phillips, who was shot during a desperate attempt to swim to shore after his canoe was too damaged to escape.

March-Phillips was a special operations veteran, proving remarkably successful in his missions. The Commando Veterans website notes: "In Memory of Major 39184 Gustavus Henry March-Phillipps DSO MBE Royal Artillery and Commando, Small Scale Raiding Force who died age 34 on 12 September 1942
Remembered with honour at ST. LAURENT-SUR-MER CHURCHYARD".

Personal life
March-Phillipps married Marjorie, later Lady Marling on 18 April 1942. He was the nephew of Gustavus Hamilton Blenkinsopp Coulson.

References

1942 deaths
1908 births
Special Air Service officers
British Army personnel killed in World War II
British Army Commandos officers
Officers of the Order of the British Empire
Royal Artillery officers
Companions of the Distinguished Service Order
English military personnel
Burials in France